Foreign aid to the People's Republic of China since 1949 has taken the form of both bilateral and multilateral official development assistance and official aid to individual recipients.

In 1978, China and Japan normalized their diplomatic relations. Deng Xiaoping had visited to Japan to sign a treaty and to look at its development. As a result, China decided to borrow US$220 million in soft loans from Japan when the amount of foreign currency preparation was US$167 million. China poured that money into social infrastructure.

In 2001 China received US$1.4 billion in foreign aid, or about US$1.10 per capita. This total was down from the 1999 figure of US$2.4 billion, or US$1.90 per capita. In 2003 China received US$1.3 billion in aid, or about US$1 per capita.  Like other countries in recent years, the United States has rapidly reduced its aid to China, reaching about $12 million from USAID for 2011.  The aid goes to Tibetan communities, rule of law initiatives, and climate change policy.  In 2011, an aid package amounting to $3.95 million and designated for climate change was the subject of a critical Congressional panel hearing titled "Feeding the Dragon: Reevaluating U.S. Development Assistance to China".

Some of this aid comes in the form of socioeconomic development assistance through the United Nations (UN). The PRC received US$112 million in UN assistance annually in 2001 and 2002, the largest portion coming from the UN Development Programme (UNDP).

See also
Foreign aid program of China
Foreign policy of China
List of charities in China
List of non-governmental organizations in China

Notes
Note: The People's Republic of China is recognized as the sole representative of China by the United Nations and by many UN members (cf. China and the United Nations, foreign relations of the People's Republic of China). The special administrative regions of Hong Kong and Macau are financially independent. Nongovernmental sources of aid are not accounted under China.

References

Foreign relations of China
Economic development in China
China, People's Republic of
Government finances in China